Seyyed Ebrahim Nabavi (born 1958 in Astara, Iran) is a prolific Iranian satirist, writer, diarist, and researcher. He currently writes in the news website Gooya and the online newspaper Rooz, and has a satirical program for the website and broadcasts on the Amsterdam based Radio Zamaneh.

Early career
During and after studying sociology at Shiraz University and University of Tehran, but before starting his political career in Tehran, Nabavi also worked as a school teacher, and taught philosophy in the Jihad of Construction (جهاد سازندگی) effort.

Nabavi started his political career working for the Iranian dalahoo in the Ministry of Culture and Islamic Guidance, the Ministry of Interior (personally invited by Ali Akbar Nategh-Nouri), and the Islamic Republic of Iran Broadcasting (personally invited by Mohammad Hashemi). His posts include the Manager of the Political Office of the Ministry of Interior in 1361–1364 AP (ca. 1982–1985 CE). According to himself, he was chosen because of his wide political knowledge about the Iranian political issues, because of his past activities with the Office for Strengthening Unity and the Organization of Muslim Students of Shiraz University, where he had worked with Ata'ollah Mohajerani, Jamileh Kadivar, and Mostafa Moeen.

Satire and journalism career
Nabavi started his satire career in the Soroush magazine in serial articles on cinema titled "andar hekāyat-e rešte va sar-r derāz va …" and continued it in the Gozaresh-e Film magazine (which he co-founded and worked as the magazine's first editor) with "rāport-hā" (reports). After leaving Gozaresh-e Film, Nabavi helped Kioumars Saberi Foumani start the Gol-Agha magazine, where he later wrote for.

While working at Gol-Agha, Nabavi started writing also for the Hamshahri monthly magazine, where he suggested establishing the Hamshahri daily newspaper, which later became very popular. Nabavi left the Hamshahri Institute three months after the resignation of Ahmad Sattari, the daily newspaper's then editor. After leaving Hamshahri, Nabavi found tried various random jobs, including designing crossword puzzles.

Nabavi later "escaped" to Isfahan in 1996, as a reason for which he has mentioned the tighter restrictions on media imposed during the ministership of Ali Larijani and Mostafa Mirsalim in the Ministry of Culture and Islamic Guidance. In Isfahan he later became active in the presidential campaign for Mohammad Khatami, after his election he moved back to Tehran. He later moved into self-imposed exile, settling in Belgium sometime in 2003 or 2004.

Nabavi became famous after starting his daily column sotūn-e panjom (Fifth column) in the newspaper Jame'eh, which he continued in several newspapers (under different variations of the title) after the newspapers were banned one after another. He also helped Fa'ezeh Hashemi in the founding of the newspaper Zan. In August 2009 he released the video "The Confession: Ebrahim Nabavi", where "dressed in striped pajamas and wearing bandages," he "confesses to meeting with a C.I.A. agent, importing green velvet, and having affairs with celebrities ranging from Marilyn Monroe and Sophia Loren to Carla Bruni and Scarlett Johansson" in a parody of defendant confessions at the 2009 election protesters show trial in Tehran. The video had over 120,000 viewings as of 10 February 2010.
 
He has also written several books of satire, interviews, prison diaries, and research on the history of Iranian satire. By 2006 he was writing for the online newspaper Rooz and the BBC News in Persian.

Nabavi has been arrested and jailed on two occasions for his political satire. During one of these periods of detention he wrote sālon-e šomāre-ye šeš (سالن شماره ۶; Corridor No 6), translated into French as Couloir n° 6 : Carnets de prison.

Awards and honors
 Viareggio Prize for foreign Journalist (2010)
 Prince Claus Award (2005)

See also
Iranian stand-up comedy

References

 Amiri, Noushabeh & and Nabavi, Seyyed Ebrahim (1999). یک گفت‌وگوی ساده (yek goftogū-ye sāde). In Nabavi, Seyyed Ebrahim, گفت‌وگوهای صریح (goftogūhā-ye sarih), pp. 13–52. Tehran, Iran: Rowzaneh. . (In Persian)

External links

 Political satire of Ebrahim Nabavi reaches abroad
  Ebrahim Nabavi's weblog where he publishes his articles in
  Perse-sans-rire, an article about Nabavi
  Nabavi's satires on Rooz
  Nabavi's satirical weblog
 Human Rights Watch calls for Nabavi's release – IFEX

People from Astara, Iran
Iranian satirists
Iranian journalists
Iranian comics writers
Iranian humorists
Belgian Shia Muslims
Iranian democracy activists
1958 births
Living people
Iranian stand-up comedians
Faculty of Social Sciences of the University of Tehran alumni